Declan Kelly may refer to:

 Declan Kelly (businessman), Irish-American business executive, entrepreneur, and philanthropist
 Declan Kelly (diplomat), Irish diplomat
 Declan Kelly (radio executive), Australian media executive